BNA Records, formerly known as BNA Entertainment, was a label group that shared ties with Arista Nashville and RCA Nashville from parent company Sony Music Nashville, which itself is a subsidiary of Sony Music Entertainment. Based in Nashville, Tennessee, BNA featured country music acts on its roster. The company derived its name from the IATA and ICAO airport codes for Nashville International Airport.

The label was founded by Boomer Castleman, who sold it to BMG Music in 1993. The first act signed was B. B. Watson.

In August 2011, Sony Nashville announced a major corporate restructuring which included the merger of Columbia Nashville into BNA. The BNA name was retired in June 2012, with the last remaining artists moving to a newly re-established Columbia Nashville.

Former artists

Rhett Akins
John Anderson
Marc Beeson
Wade Bowen
Shannon Brown
Tracy Byrd
Kenny Chesney
Terri Clark
Kellie Coffey
Dale Daniel
Jennifer Day
Bill Engvall
Tyler Farr
Pat Green
Merle Haggard
Kim Hill
Jesse Hunter
Casey James
Keith Whitley
Chris Janson
Sarah Johns
Jamey Johnson
George Jones (Bandit/BNA)
The Kentucky Headhunters
Blaine Larsen (Giantslayer/BNA)
Jim Lauderdale
Aaron Lines
Lonestar
The Lost Trailers
The Lunabelles
Mindy McCready
Craig Morgan
Lorrie Morgan
K. T. Oslin
Kellie Pickler
Pinmonkey
Rachel Proctor
The Remingtons
John Rich
Tim Ryan
Jason Sellers
Lisa Stewart
Doug Supernaw
Tebey
Turner Nichols
Ray Vega
The Warren Brothers
B. B. Watson
The Wilkinsons

See also
Arista Nashville
Columbia Records Nashville
RCA Records Nashville

References

Record labels based in Nashville, Tennessee
Record labels established in 1991
American country music record labels
RCA Records Music Group
Sony Music
Record labels disestablished in 2012
1991 establishments in the United States